Chapter 13 is the fifth studio album released by Dutch death metal band Gorefest. It was released in 1998.

Track listing 
 "Chapter Thirteen" – 3:05
 "Broken Wing" – 4:04
 "Nothingness" – 2:23
 "Smile" – 3:08
 "The Idiot" – 3:37
 "Repentance" – 5:04
 "Bordello" – 2:54
 "F.S. 2000" – 6:09
 "All Is Well" – 3:30
 "Unsung" – 5:54
 "Burn Out" – 3:15
 "Super Reality – 3:16
 "Serve the Masses" – 5:01

Band members 
 Jan-Chris de Koeijer – vocals, bass guitar
 Frank Harthoorn – guitar
 Boudewijn Vincent Bonebakker – guitar
 Ed Warby – drums
 Rene Merkelback – mellotron and grand piano

References 

1998 albums
Gorefest albums
SPV/Steamhammer albums